Serva is a rural locality (a settlement) in Yukseyevskoye Rural Settlement, Kochyovsky District, Perm Krai, Russia. The population was 260 as of 2010. There are 6 streets.

Geography 
Serva is located 41 km north of Kochyovo (the district's administrative centre) by road. Yukseyevo is the nearest rural locality.

References 

Rural localities in Kochyovsky District